A congressional intern may refer to:
United States House of Representatives Page
United States Senate Page